Mohammad Aslam Khan may refer to:

 Mohammad Aslam Khan (Pakistan Peoples Party politician) (1937–1997),   member of the upper house of parliament of Pakistan
 Mohammad Aslam Khan (Pakistan Tehreek-e-Insaf politician), member of the National Assembly of Pakistan

See also
 Muhammad Aslam Khan (1923–1994), Pakistan Army general